Leimersheim is a municipality in the district of Germersheim, in Rhineland-Palatinate, Germany.

History
In the early 18th century, there were two Jewish families living in Leimersheim, and by the early 19th century, there were ten families.  By 1880, there were 118 Jewish people living in Leimersheim, which eventually went down to 26 by 1932 before the beginning of World War II.

Famous people 
 Reinhard Liebel (1841-1905), businessman and politician from Erie, Pennsylvania; born in Leimersheim.

References

Germersheim (district)